Elytroleptus immaculipennis is a species of beetle in the family Cerambycidae. It was described by Knull in 1935.

References

Elytroleptus
Beetles described in 1935